Potapkovo is a rural locality (a village) in Posyolok Dobryatino, Gus-Khrustalny District, Vladimir Oblast, Russia. The population was 21 as of 2010.

Geography 
Potapkovo is located 60 km southeast of Gus-Khrustalny (the district's administrative centre) by road. Dobryatino is the nearest rural locality.

References 

Rural localities in Gus-Khrustalny District
Melenkovsky Uyezd